A Request for Comments (RFC), in the context of Internet governance, is a type of publication from the Internet Engineering Task Force (IETF) and the Internet Society (ISOC), usually describing methods, behaviors, research, or innovations applicable to the working of the Internet and Internet-connected systems.

Almost every April Fools' Day (1 April) since 1989, the Internet RFC Editor has published one or more humorous Request for Comments (RFC) documents, following in the path blazed by the June 1973 RFC 527 called ARPAWOCKY, a parody of Lewis Carroll's nonsense poem "Jabberwocky". The following list also includes humorous RFCs published on other dates.

List of April Fools' RFCs 
 
 
 A parody of the TCP/IP documentation style. For a long time it was specially marked in the RFC index with "note date of issue".

 
 

 
  (see IP over Avian Carriers)
 Updated by RFC 2549; see below. Describes protocol for transmitting IP packets by homing pigeon.
 In 2001, RFC 1149 was actually implemented by members of the Bergen Linux User Group.
 See also RFC 6214, as noted below. Describes the adaptation of RFC 1149 for IPv6.

 
 
 

 
 

 
 
 

 
 
Attributed to William Shakespeare.
 
 

 
 

 
 
 
 
 

 
 

 
 
 
 This RFC is not solely for entertainment, but the described protocol has regularly been implemented at hacker events in Europe. 
 
  (see Hyper Text Coffee Pot Control Protocol)
 

 
  Updates RFC 1149, listed above. (see IP over Avian Carriers)
 
 

 
 
 Concerning the practicalities of the infinite monkey theorem.

 
 
 
 

 
 
 

 
 
 Proposal for the evil bit, an IPv4 packet header; later became a synonym for all attempts to seek simple technical solutions for difficult human social problems which require the willing participation of malicious actors.

 
 

 
 
 
Notable for containing PDP-10 assembly language code nearly 22 years after the manufacturer ceased production of the PDP-10, and for being technically possible as opposed to many of these other proposals.
 

 
 

 
 
 

 
 
 
 implemented on Facebook Ipv6 over Facebook.

 
 

 
 
  (see IP over Avian Carriers)
 

 
 
 

 
 
 

 
  (see Hyper Text Coffee Pot Control Protocol)
 

 
 
 

 
 An April 1st RFC was not published this year.

Other humorous RFCs 

 
 
  Makes humorous statements about the NULL encryption algorithm.

Non-RFC IETF humor 
 An announcement on the IETF list about the appointment of the Sesame Street character Bert as member of the IAB appears to have been the April Fools' Day 2006 stunt.

Submission of April Fools' Day RFCs 
The RFC Editor accepts submission of properly formatted April Fools' Day RFCs from the general public, and considers them for publication in the same year if received at least two weeks prior to April 1st. 
"Note that in past years the RFC Editor has sometimes published serious documents with April 1 dates.  Readers who cannot distinguish satire by reading the text may have a future in marketing."

References

Further reading
 RFC Editor home page – hosts individual RFCs

External links 
  on RFC 3751 and April Fools' Day RFCs in general 
 

April Fools' Day jokes
Request for Comments
Computer humor
Hacker culture